Sanjay, also spelled Sanjai, Sanjey, Sanje, Sanjaey and Sunjay, is a male given name of Sanskrit origin meaning "triumphant" (from Sañjaya) and may refer to:

People
 Sanjaya, an important character in the ancient Indian epic Mahabharata
 Sanjay Gupta (born 1969), a neurosurgeon and CNN senior medical correspondent
 Sanjay Manjrekar (born 1965), a former Indian cricketer

Actor
 Sanjay Dutt (born 1959), an Indian actor
 Sanjay Shejwal, an Indian actor
 Sanjay Kapoor, an Indian actor and producer, and brother of Anil Kapoor
 Sanjay Khan (born 1941), an Indian actor, director and producer
 Sanjay Mitra (actor), an Indian actor in Malayalam cinema and television
 Sanjaya Malakar (born 1989), American singer and finalist on the sixth season of American Idol
 Sanjay Suri (born 1971), an Indian actor and producer

Cinema
 Sanjay Leela Bhansali (born 1963), an Indian film director
 Sanjay Mehrotra, CEO of Micron Technology and co-founder of Sandisk.
 Sanjay Patel, a British American animator

Musician
 Sanjay Subrahmanyan (born 1968), a Carnatic vocalist from India
 Sunjay (born 1993), British singer-songwriter

Politician
 Sanjay Awasthy Politician and MLA from Arki, Himachal Pradesh, India
 Sanjay Bansode (born 1973), an Indian politician and minister in government of Maharashtra
 Sanjay Gandhi (1946–1980), an Indian politician and son of former prime minister of India Indira Gandhi
 Sanjay Sinh (born 1951), an Indian politician from the state of Uttar Pradesh

Fictional characters
 Sanjay Nahasapeemapetilon, the younger brother of Apu in the American animated sitcom The Simpsons
 Sanjay, an Indian American character on the American animated series The Fairly OddParents
 Prince Sanjay of Ishkebar, a character in the American sitcom The Suite Life of Zack & Cody
 Sanjay Dravid, an Indian scientist in the Power of Five novel series
 Sanjay Patel, a main character in the 2013 American animated series Sanjay and Craig
 Sanjay Patel and 'Sanjay 2' otherwise known as 'sanjay is here now', a characters in the American sitcom Modern Family
 Sanjay Rash, a Separatist puppet ruler in the fifth season of Star Wars: The Clone Wars

Indian masculine given names